Câineni is a commune located in Vâlcea County, Oltenia, Romania. It is composed of six villages: Câinenii Mari, Câinenii Mici (the commune centre), Greblești, Priloage, Râu Vadului, and Robești.

Natives
 Cecilia Cuțescu-Storck
 Emilia Vătășoiu

References

Communes in Vâlcea County
Localities in Oltenia